Cao Miao is a variety of Dong (Kam) according to Shi Lin (2012). Dialects include Liushi ("Sixty") Miao 六十苗, Sishi ("Forty") Miao 四十苗, and Ershi ("Twenty") Miao 二十苗 (also known as Flowery Miao 花苗). The Flowery Miao 花苗 do not consider themselves to be Cao Miao 草苗, although their language is similar to Sixty Miao and Forty Miao (Shi 2012).

Subdivisions
There are various ethnic subgroups within Cao Miao (Shi 2015:7).

Inner Miao 内部苗 (or 内岗苗 / 内堺苗): 2 subgroups
Sixty (60) Miao 六十苗
Forty (40) Miao 四十苗, also called Diao 刁族
Middle Miao 中部苗 (or 中岗苗 / 中堺苗), also called Twenty (20) Miao 二十苗 or Flowery Miao 花苗.
Outer Miao 外部苗 (or 外岗苗 / 外堺苗), also called Old Miao 老苗 or Black Miao 黑苗.

Other ethnolinguistic groups living near the Cao Miao include the Han 汉族, Dong 侗族, Yao 瑶族, Suantang 酸汤人, Sanqiao 三撬人, Pinghua speakers, Hakka 客家人, Chuanmin 船民 (a Guibei 桂北 Yue Chinese lect), Naxi 那溪人, Liujia 六甲人, and Liuse 六色人.

Population
There is a total of 58,900 Cao Miao people (Shi 2015:9). The following population statistics are from Shi (2015:9).

By ethnic subgroup:
60 Miao: 49,300 people (in 126 villages)
20 Miao (Flowery Miao): 5,930 people
40 Miao (also called Diao 刁族): 3,620 people (in 18 villages of Liping and Tongdao counties)

By county:
Liping County, Guizhou: 19,000 people (consisting of 60 Miao, 40 Miao, and 20 Miao)
Sanjiang Dong Autonomous County, Guangxi: 31,600 people (consisting of only 60 Miao)
Tongdao Dong Autonomous County, Hunan: 6,800 people (consisting of 60 Miao and 20 Miao, but no 40 Miao)
Congjiang County, Guizhou: 1,020 people (consisting of only 40 Miao)
Jingzhou, Hunan: 500+ people (consisting of 20 Miao and Outer Miao)

Distribution
Below are languages and their respective locations studied by Shi Lin (2012).
Liushi (60) Miao 六十苗: Qifan 起凡 (in Liping), Dagaoping 大高坪 (in Tongdao), Gaoyu 高宇 (in Sanjiang)
Sishi (40) Miao 四十苗: Tanghua 堂华 (in Tongdao)
Ershi (20) Miao 二十苗: Kenxi 肯溪 (in Tongdao)
Southern Dong: Longcheng 陇城 (in Tongdao), Chengyang 程阳 (in Sanjiang)
Northern Dong: Xiudong 秀洞 (in Jinping), Sanmentang 三门塘 (in Tianzhu)

Ethnic Cao Miao also live in the following townships.
Sanjiang Dong Autonomous County, Guangxi
Tongle 同乐乡
Bajiang 八江乡
Liangkou 良口乡
Yangxi 洋溪乡
Dudong 独峒乡
Linxi 林溪乡
Liping County, Guizhou
Shuikou 水口镇
Zhaoxing 肇兴乡
Hongzhou 洪洲镇
Long'e 龙额乡
Deshun 德顺乡
Shunhua 顺化乡
Diping 地坪乡
Leidong 雷洞乡
Tongdao Dong Autonomous County, Hunan
Dagaoping 大高坪
Yatunbao 牙屯堡
Dupo 独坡乡

Sishi Miao 四十苗 is spoken in these townships:
Liping County: Shuikou 水口镇 (including Qifan 起凡村), Zhaoxing 肇兴乡, Yongcong 永从乡
Rongjiang County: Luoxiang 洛香镇

The Flowery Miao live in Luoxiang 洛香镇, Congjiang County; Guochong 锅冲乡 and Dagaoping 大高坪, Tongdao County; Deshun 德顺乡, Liping County. In Liping County, they are also known as the "Flowery-Clothed Miao" (花衣苗) (Liping County Gazetteer 1989:153). According to Shi Lin (2012), Flowery Miao 花苗 (Ershi Miao 二十苗) is spoken in these townships:
Liping County: Deshun 德顺乡
Tongdao County: Guochong 锅冲乡 (including Kenxi 肯溪村), Dagaoping 大高坪乡, Boyang 播阳乡, Xianxi 县溪镇
Jingzhou County: Xinchang 新厂镇

Other Cao Miao locations include:
Liping County, Guizhou
Tangbi Village 塘婢村, Leidong Township 雷洞乡
Jiujue Village 九厥村, Hongzhou Township 洪州镇
Guigong 归公, Diping Township 地坪乡
Guibai 归白, Diping Township 地坪乡
Pingsong 平松, Shuikou Township 水口镇
Bashan 八善, Shuikou Township 水口镇
Gaoze Village 高泽村, Shunhua Township 顺化乡
Sanjiang Dong Autonomous County, Guangxi
Fenshui 汾水, Bajiang Township 八江乡
Gaoya 高亚, Dudong Township 独峒乡
Rongshui Miao Autonomous County, Guangxi
Rongtang Village 荣塘村, Sirong Township 四荣乡

References

Bibliography
Shi Lin [石林]. 2015. Three language varieties of the Hunan-Guizhou-Guangxi border region [湘黔桂边区的三个族群方言岛]. Beijing: China Social Sciences Academy Press [中国社会科学出版社]. 

Languages of China
Kam–Sui languages